Jones Gifford Nash (22 January 1812 – 19 April 1877) was an English first-class cricketer.

Nash made his debut in first-class cricket for the Gentlemen of England against the Gentlemen of Kent at Canterbury in 1847. He made five further first-class appearances for the Gentlemen of England from 1848–53, all against the Gentlemen of Kent. Playing as a slow underarm bowler, Nash took 34 wickets at an average of 17.50. He took five wickets in an innings on two occasions and took ten wickets in a match once. By profession he was a brewer, wine and spirits merchant and was a partner in the business Hawkes, Nash, and Co. He died at Kentish Town in April 1877.

References

External links

1812 births
1877 deaths
19th-century English businesspeople
Cricketers from Bishop's Stortford
English brewers
English cricketers
English merchants
Gentlemen of England cricketers